Estamos en la pecera is the eighth album recorded by the Argentine rock band Vox Dei.
First without Ricardo Soulé and is the only album with Carlos Michelini.

Overview 
Following the departure of Soulé in 1974, Willy Quiroga and Rubén Basoalto hire Beto Fortunato and Carlos Michelini as new guitar players, who recorded a song "Nada Es Tan Difícil Como Estar Vivo", which appears on the Rock Competition compilation from 1975, together with Trio Lluvia, Vivencia (band) and Invisible among others. 
Nonetheless, for the recording sessions of this album, only Michelini was featured.

In 1996 "Nada Es Tan Difícil Como Estar Vivo", appeared on 30 Años de Rock Nacional, Vol. 1, a various artists' compilation released by Columbia Records.

On December 2, 2016, Vox Dei played together with Javier Martinez's Manal at Teatro Gran Rex (Buenos Aires), and released that same night the Estamos en la Pecera remastered CD edition, which features one track from the previous sessions with Beto Fortunato. The remaster issue is published by La Rompe Records (Vox Dei label) under Sony Music license.

Songs
All songs written by Willy Quiroga, Rubén Basoalto and Carlos Michelini except the indicated.

Credits
Band
Willy Quiroga - Bass guitar and vocals.
Carlos Michelini - Guitars and vocals.
Rubén Basoalto - Drums, percussion and backing vocals.
Beto Fortunato - Guitar on bonus track.

Guests
Las Tarantulas - Percussion.

References

Vox Dei discography (Spanish)

External links
Vox Dei's official webpage (Spanish)

Vox Dei albums
1975 albums